Subiza may refer to:

General
 Subiza (album)
 Subiza (town)